The 166 Squadron of the Israeli Air Force, also known as the Fire Birds Squadron, is an Elbit Hermes 900 squadron based at Palmachim Airbase.

References

Israeli Air Force squadrons